Tajiks (Tājīk, Tājek) are a Persian-speaking Iranian ethnic group native to Central Asia, living primarily in Afghanistan, Tajikistan, and Uzbekistan. Tajiks are the largest ethnicity in Tajikistan, and the second-largest in Afghanistan and Uzbekistan. They speak varieties of Persian, a Western Iranian language. In Tajikistan, since the 1939 Soviet census, its small Pamiri and Yaghnobi ethnic groups are included as Tajiks. In China, the term is used to refer to its Pamiri ethnic groups, the Tajiks of Xinjiang, who speak the Eastern Iranian Pamiri languages. In Afghanistan, the Pamiris are counted as a separate ethnic group.

As a self-designation, the literary New Persian term Tajik, which originally had some previous pejorative usage as a label for eastern Persians or Iranians, has become acceptable during the last several decades, particularly as a result of Soviet administration in Central Asia. Alternative names for the Tajiks are Eastern Persian, Fārsīwān (Persian-speaker), and Dīhgān (cf. ) which translates to "farmer or settled villager", in a wider sense "settled" in contrast to "nomadic" and was later used to describe a class of land-owning magnates as "Persian of noble blood" in contrast to Arabs, Turks and Romans during the Sassanid and early Islamic period.

History 

The Tajiks are an Iranian people, speaking a variety of Persian, concentrated in the Oxus Basin, the Farḡāna valley (Tajikistan and parts of Uzbekistan) and on both banks of the upper Oxus, i.e., the Pamir Mountains (Mountain Badaḵšān, in Tajikistan) and northeastern Afghanistan (Badaḵšān). Historically, the ancient Tajiks were chiefly agriculturalists before the Arab Conquest of Iran. While agriculture remained a stronghold, the Islamization of Iran also resulted in the rapid urbanization of historical Khorasan and Transoxiana that lasted until the devastating Mongolian invasion. Several surviving ancient urban centers of the Tajik people include Samarkand, Bukhara, Khujand, and Termez.

Contemporary Tajiks are the descendants of ancient Eastern Iranian inhabitants of Central Asia, in particular, the Sogdians and the Bactrians, and possibly other groups, with an admixture of Western Iranian Persians and non-Iranian peoples. According to Richard Nelson Frye, a leading historian of Iranian and Central Asian history, the Persian migration to Central Asia may be considered the beginning of the modern Tajik nation, and ethnic Persians, along with some elements of East-Iranian Bactrians and Sogdians, as the main ancestors of modern Tajiks. In later works, Frye expands on the complexity of the historical origins of the Tajiks. In a 1996 publication, Frye explains that many "factors must be taken into account in explaining the evolution of the peoples whose remnants are the Tajiks in Central Asia" and that "the peoples of Central Asia, whether Iranian or Turkic speaking, have one culture, one religion, one set of social values and traditions with only language separating them."

Regarding Tajiks, the Encyclopædia Britannica states:

The geographical division between the eastern and western Iranians is often considered historically and currently to be the desert Dasht-e Kavir, situated in the center of the Iranian plateau.

Further according to Richard Foltz:

Modern History 
During the Soviet-Afghan War, the Tajik-dominated Jamiat-e Islami founded by Burhanuddin Rabbani resisted the Red Army and the communist Afghan government. Tajik commander, Ahmad Shah Massoud, successfully repelled nine Soviet campaigns from taking Panjshir Valley and earned the nickname "Lion of Panjshir".

Name 

According to John Perry (Encyclopaedia Iranica):
The most plausible and generally accepted origin of the word is Middle Persian tāzīk 'Arab' (cf. New Persian tāzi), or an Iranian (Sogdian or Parthian) cognate word. The Muslim armies that invaded Transoxiana early in the eighth century, conquering the Sogdian principalities and clashing with the Qarluq Turks (see Bregel, Atlas, Maps 8–10) consisted not only of Arabs, but also of Persian converts from Fārs and the central Zagros region (Bartol'd [Barthold], "Tadžiki," pp. 455–57). Hence the Turks of Central Asia adopted a variant of the Iranian word, täžik, to designate their Muslim adversaries in general. For example, the rulers of the south Indian Chalukya dynasty and Rashtrakuta dynasty also referred to the Arabs as "Tajika" in the 8th and 9th century.The First Spring: The Golden Age of India  by Abraham Eraly p.91 By the eleventh century (Yusof Ḵāṣṣ-ḥājeb, Qutadḡu bilig, lines 280, 282, 3265), the Qarakhanid Turks applied this term more specifically to the Persian Muslims in the Oxus basin and Khorasan, who were variously the Turks' rivals, models, overlords (under the Samanid Dynasty), and subjects (from Ghaznavid times on). Persian writers of the Ghaznavid, Seljuq and Atābak periods (ca. 1000–1260) adopted the term and extended its use to cover Persians in the rest of Greater Iran, now under Turkish rule, as early as the poet ʿOnṣori, ca. 1025 (Dabirsiāqi, pp. 3377, 3408). Iranians soon accepted it as an ethnonym, as is shown by a Persian court official's referring to mā tāzikān "we Tajiks" (Bayhaqi, ed. Fayyāz, p. 594). The distinction between Turk and Tajik became stereotyped to express the symbiosis and rivalry of the (ideally) nomadic military executive and the urban civil bureaucracy (Niẓām al-Molk: tāzik, pp. 146, 178–79; Fragner, "Tādjīk. 2" in EI2 10, p. 63).

The word also occurs in the Tonyukuk inscriptions as tözik, used for a local Arab tribe in the Tashkent area. These Arabs were said to be from the Taz tribe, which is still found in Yemen. In the 7th-century, the Taz began to Islamize Transoxiana.

According to the Encyclopaedia of Islam, however, the oldest known usage of the word Tajik as a reference to Persians in Persian literature can be found in the writings of the Persian poet Jalal ad-Din Rumi. The 15th-century Turkic-speaking poet Mīr Alī Šer Navā'ī also used Tajik as a reference to Persians.

Location 

The Tajiks are the principal ethnic group in most of Tajikistan, as well as in northern and western Afghanistan, though there are more Tajiks in Afghanistan than in Tajikistan. Tajiks are a substantial minority in Uzbekistan, as well as in overseas communities. Historically, the ancestors of the Tajiks lived in a larger territory in Central Asia than now.

Tajikistan 

Tajiks make up around 84.3% of the population of Tajikistan. This number includes speakers of the Pamiri languages, including Wakhi and Shughni, and the Yaghnobi people who in the past were considered by the government of the Soviet Union nationalities separate from the Tajiks. In the 1926 and 1937 Soviet censuses, the Yaghnobis and Pamiri language speakers were counted as separate nationalities. After 1937, these groups were required to register as Tajiks.

Afghanistan 

According to the World Factbook, Tajiks make up about 27% of the population in Afghanistan, but according to other sources, they form 37%–39% of the population. According to the Encyclopædia Britannica they constitute about one-fifth of the population. They are predominant in four of the largest cities in Afghanistan (Kabul, Mazar-e Sharif, Herat, and Ghazni) and make up the largest ethnic group in the northern and western provinces of Balkh, Takhar, Badakhshan, Samangan, Parwan, Panjshir, Kapisa, Baghlan, Ghor, Badghis and Herat.

In Afghanistan, the Tajiks do not organize themselves by tribes and refer to themselves by the region, province, city, town, or village that they are from; such as Badakhshi, Baghlani, Mazari, Panjsheri, Kabuli, Herati, Kohistani, etc. Although in the past, some non-Pashto speaking tribes were identified as Tajik, for example, the Furmuli.

Uzbekistan 

In Uzbekistan, the Tajiks are the largest part of the population of the ancient cities of Bukhara and Samarkand, and are found in large numbers in the Surxondaryo Region in the south and along Uzbekistan's eastern border with Tajikistan. According to official statistics (2000), Surxondaryo Region accounts for 24.4% of all Tajiks in Uzbekistan, with another 34.3% in Samarqand and Bukhara regions.

Official statistics in Uzbekistan state that the Tajik community accounts for 5% of the nation's population. However, these numbers do not include ethnic Tajiks who, for a variety of reasons, choose to identify themselves as Uzbeks in population census forms. During the Soviet "Uzbekization" supervised by Sharof Rashidov, the head of the Uzbek Communist Party, Tajiks had to choose either stay in Uzbekistan and get registered as Uzbek in their passports or leave the republic for Tajikistan, which is mountainous and less agricultural. It is only in the last population census (1989) that the nationality could be reported not according to the passport, but freely declared based on the respondent's ethnic self-identification. This had the effect of increasing the Tajik population in Uzbekistan from 3.9% in 1979 to 4.7% in 1989. Some scholars estimate that Tajiks may make up 35% of Uzbekistan's population.

China 

Chinese Tajiks or Mountain Tajiks in China (Sarikoli: , Tujik), including Sarikolis (majority) and Wakhis (minority) in China, are the Pamiri ethnic group that lives in the Xinjiang Uyghur Autonomous Region in Northwestern China. They are one of the 56 nationalities officially recognized by the government of the People's Republic of China.

Kazakhstan 

According to the 1999 population census, there were 26,000 Tajiks in Kazakhstan (0.17% of the total population), about the same number as in the 1989 census.

Kyrgyzstan 

According to official statistics, there were about 47,500 Tajiks in Kyrgyzstan in 2007 (0.9% of the total population), up from 42,600 in the 1999 census and 33,500 in the 1989 census.

Turkmenistan 

According to the last Soviet census in 1989, there were 3,149 Tajiks in Turkmenistan, or less than 0.1% of the total population of 3.5 million at that time. The first population census of independent Turkmenistan conducted in 1995 showed 3,103 Tajiks in a population of 4.4 million (0.07%), most of them (1,922) concentrated in the eastern provinces of Lebap and Mary adjoining the borders with Afghanistan and Uzbekistan.

Russia 
The population of Tajiks in Russia was about 200,303 according to the 2010 census, up from 38,000 in the last Soviet census of 1989. Most Tajiks came to Russia after the dissolution of the Soviet Union, often as guest workers in places like Moscow and Saint Petersburg or federal subjects near the Kazakhstan border. There are currently estimated to be over one million Tajik guest workers living in Russia, with their remittances accounting for as much as half of Tajikistan's economy.

Pakistan 

There are an estimated 220,000 Tajiks in Pakistan as of 2012, mainly refugees from Afghanistan. During the 1990s, as a result of the Tajikistan Civil War, between 700 and 1,200 Tajikistanis arrived in Pakistan, mainly as students, the children of Tajikistani refugees in Afghanistan. In 2002, around 300 requested to return home and were repatriated back to Tajikistan with the help of the IOM, UNHCR and the two countries' authorities.

Genetics 
A 2014 study of the maternal haplogroups of Tajiks revealed substantial admixture of West Eurasian and East Eurasian lineages, and also the presence of South Asian and North African lineages, as well.

West Eurasian maternal lineages included haplogroups H, J, K, T, I, W and U. East Eurasian lineages included haplogroups M, C, Z, D, G, A, Y and B. South Asian lineages detected in this study included haplogroups M and R. One lineage in the Tajik sample was assigned to the North African maternal haplogroup X2j.

The dominant paternal haplogroup among modern Tajiks is the Haplogroup R1a Y-DNA. ~45% of Tajik men share R1a (M17), ~18% J (M172), ~8% R2 (M124), and ~8% C (M130 & M48). Tajiks of Panjikent score 68% R1a, Tajiks of  Khojant score 64% R1a. The high frequency of haplogroup R1a in the Tajiks probably reflects a strong founder effect. According to another genetic test, 63% of Tajik male samples from Tajikistan carry R1a.

An autosomal DNA study by Guarino-Vignon et al. (2022), suggested that modern Tajiks show genetic continuity with ancient samples from Tajikistan and Turkmenistan. The genetic ancestry of Tajiks consists largely of a West-Eurasian component (~74%), an East Asian-related component (~18%), and a South Asian component samplified by Great Andamanese (~8%). According to the authors, the South Asian (Great Andamanese) affinity of Tajiks was previously unreported, although evidence for the presence of a deep South Asian ancestry was already found previously in other Central Asian samples (eg. among modern Turkmens and historical Bactria–Margiana Archaeological Complex samples). Both historical and more recent geneflow (~1500 years ago) shaped the genetic makeup of Southern Central Asian populations, such as the Tajiks. A follow-up study by Dai et al. (2022) estimated that the Tajiks derive between 11.6–18.6% ancestry from admixture with from an East-Eurasian steppe source represented by the Xiongnu, with the remainder of their ancestry being derived from Western Steppe Herders and BMAC components, as well as a small contribution from the early population associated with the Tarim mummies. The authors concluded that Tajiks "present patterns of genetic continuity of Central Asians since the Bronze Age".

Culture

Language 

The language of the Tajiks is an eastern dialect of Persian, called Dari (derived from Darbārī, "[of/from the] royal courts", in the sense of "courtly language"), or also Parsi-e Darbari. In Tajikistan, where Cyrillic script is used, it is called the Tajiki language. In Afghanistan, unlike in Tajikistan, Tajiks continue to use the Perso-Arabic script, as well as in Iran. However, when the Soviet Union introduced the Latin script in 1928, and later the Cyrillic script, the Persian dialect of Tajikistan came to be considered a separate (Persian) language. Since the 19th century, Tajiki has been strongly influenced by the Russian language and has incorporated many Russian language loan words. It has also adopted fewer Arabic loan words than Iranian Persian while retaining vocabulary that has fallen out of use in the latter language. In Tajikistan, in ordinary speech, also known as "zaboni kucha" (lit. "street language", as opposed to "zaboni adabi", lit. "literary language", which is used in schools, media etc.), many urban Tajiks prefer to use Russian loanwords instead of their literary Persian analogs.

The dialects of modern Persian spoken throughout Greater Iran have a common origin. This is due to the fact that one of Greater Iran's historical cultural capitals, called Greater Khorasan, which included parts of modern Central Asia and much of Afghanistan and constitutes as the Tajik's ancestral homeland, played a key role in the development and propagation of Persian language and culture throughout much of Greater Iran after the Muslim conquest. Furthermore, early manuscripts of the historical Persian spoken in Mashhad during the development of Middle to New Persian show that their origins came from Sistan, in present-day Afghanistan.

Religion 

Various scholars have recorded the Zoroastrian, Hindu, and Buddhist pre-Islamic heritage of the Tajik people. Early temples for fire worship have been found in Balkh and Bactria and excavations in present-day Tajikistan and Uzbekistan show remnants of Zoroastrian fire temples.

Today, however, the great majority of Tajiks follow Sunni Islam, although small Twelver and Ismaili Shia minorities also exist in scattered pockets. Areas with large numbers of Shias include Herat, Badakhshan provinces in Afghanistan, the Gorno-Badakhshan Autonomous Province in Tajikistan, and Tashkurgan Tajik Autonomous County in China. Some of the famous Islamic scholars were from either modern or historical East-Iranian regions lying in Afghanistan, Tajikistan, Uzbekistan and Turkmenistan and therefore can arguably be viewed as Tajiks. They include Abu Hanifa, Imam Bukhari, Tirmidhi, Abu Dawood, Nasir Khusraw and many others.

According to a 2009 U.S. State Department release, the population of Tajikistan is 98% Muslim, (approximately 85% Sunni and 5% Shia). In Afghanistan, the great number of Tajiks adhere to Sunni Islam. The smaller number of Tajiks who may follow Twelver Shia Islam are locally called Farsiwan. The community of Bukharian Jews in Central Asia speak a dialect of Persian. The Bukharian Jewish community in Uzbekistan is the largest remaining community of Central Asian Jews and resides primarily in Bukhara and Samarkand, while the Bukharaian Jews of Tajikistan live in Dushanbe and number only a few hundred. From the 1970s to the 1990s the majority of these Tajik-speaking Jews emigrated to the United States and to Israel in accordance with Aliyah. Recently, the Protestant community of Tajiks descent has experienced significant growth, a 2015 study estimates some 2,600 Muslim Tajik converted to Christianity.

Tajikistan marked 2009 as the year to commemorate the Tajik Sunni Muslim jurist Abu Hanifa, whose ancestry hailed from Parwan Province of Afghanistan, as the nation hosted an international symposium that drew scientific and religious leaders. The construction of one of the largest mosques in the world, funded by Qatar, was announced in October 2009. The mosque is planned to be built in Dushanbe and construction is said to be completed by 2014.

Recent developments

Cultural revival 

The collapse of the Soviet Union and the Civil War in Afghanistan both gave rise to a resurgence in Tajik nationalism across the region, including a trial to revert to the Perso-Arabic script in Tajikistan.  Furthermore, Tajikistan in particular has been a focal point for this movement, and the government there has made a conscious effort to revive the legacy of the Samanid empire, the first Tajik-dominated state in the region after the Arab advance. For instance, the President of Tajikistan, Emomalii Rahmon, dropped the Russian suffix "-ov" from his surname and directed others to adopt Tajik names when registering births. According to a government announcement in October 2009, approximately 4,000 Tajik nationals have dropped "ov" and "ev" from their surnames since the start of the year.

In September 2009, the Islamic Renaissance Party of Tajikistan proposed a draft law to have the nation's language referred to as "Tajiki-Farsi" rather than "Tajik." The proposal drew criticism from Russian media since the bill sought to remove the Russian language as Tajikistan's inter-ethnic lingua franca. In 1989, the original name of the language (Farsi) had been added to its official name in brackets, though Rahmon's government renamed the language to simply "Tajiki" in 1994. On 6 October 2009, Tajikistan adopted the law that removes Russian as the lingua franca and mandated Tajik as the language to be used in official documents and education, with an exception for members Tajikistan's ethnic minority groups, who would be permitted to receive an education in the language of their choosing.

See also 

 Bukharan Jews
 Farsiwan
 Persian people
 Chagatai Tajiks
 Kharduri Tajiks
 Tashkurgan Tajik Autonomous County
 Tajiks of Xinjiang

References

Further reading

External links 
 
 Tajiks at Encyclopædia Britannica Online
 Tajik – The Ethnonym: Origins and Application at Encyclopædia Iranica

 
Ethnic groups in Afghanistan
Ethnic groups in Tajikistan
Ethnic groups in Uzbekistan
Iranian ethnic groups
Ethnic groups divided by international borders